is a former Japanese football player. He played for Japan national team.

Club career
Honda was born in Kitakyushu on June 25, 1969. After graduating from high school, he joined Japan Soccer League club Honda in 1988. In 1992, he moved to J1 League club Kashima Antlers. The club won the champions at J1 League 4 times, J.League Cup 3 times and Emperor's Cup 2 times. He retired end of 2006 season. He played 400 games and scored 6 goals in the league at both clubs.

National team career
On October 24, 1995, Honda debuted for Japan national team against Saudi Arabia. In 1996, he played in all matches including 1996 Asian Cup. In 1997, although he played at 1998 World Cup qualification, his opportunity to play decreased in the latter half. He played 29 games and scored 1 goal for Japan until 1997.

Club statistics

National team statistics

 1996 Asian Cup

SASUKE
Honda competed in SASUKE 26, where he failed the second obstacle, the Hazard Swing.

References

External links
 
 Japan National Football Team Database
 

1969 births
Living people
Association football people from Fukuoka Prefecture
Japanese footballers
Japan international footballers
Japan Soccer League players
J1 League players
Honda FC players
Kashima Antlers players
1996 AFC Asian Cup players
Sportspeople from Kitakyushu
Association football midfielders